Skeatry is a townland in the north of County Monaghan in Ireland. It covers an area of about 62 acres, which is approximately 0.25 square kilometers. The townland of Sheskin borders it to the North-East. It is located about 11km away from Monaghan town.

References

Townlands of County Monaghan